Satan's Dancer is a 2013 Burmese drama film, directed by Wyne starring Nay Toe, Thet Mon Myint, Heavy Phyo and Yoon Yoon. The film, produced by Dawei Film Production premiered Myanmar on March 2, 2013.

Cast

Main cast
Nay Toe as Yaw Min
Thet Mon Myint as Kyway Yote 
Heavy Phyo as Young Yaw Min, childhood life of Yaw Min
Yoon Yoon as Young Kyway Yote, childhood life of Kyway Yote
Zin Wine as U Htun

Guest cast
Yan Aung
Soe Moe Kyi

Award

References

2013 films
2010s Burmese-language films
Burmese drama films
Films shot in Myanmar
Films directed by Wyne
2013 drama films